The Deputy Prime Minister of Indonesia was a title given to a member of the Cabinet of Ministers of between 1947 and 1966. The deputy prime minister served as acting prime minister in the absence of the Prime Minister of Indonesia. This position was abolished in 1966.

List of Deputy Prime Minister of Indonesia

Indonesian national revolution era

United States of Indonesia era

Parliament democracy era

Guided democracy era

Deputy First Minister (1960–63)

Deputy Prime Minister (1963–66)

See also

Deputy prime minister
President of Indonesia
List of presidents of Indonesia
Vice President of Indonesia
List of vice presidents of Indonesia
Prime Minister of Indonesia
Elections in Indonesia
Politics of Indonesia

References

Lists of government ministers of Indonesia
Lists of political office-holders in Indonesia
1947 establishments in Indonesia
1966 disestablishments in Indonesia